Seaford to Beachy Head is a  biological and geological Site of Special Scientific Interest which stretches from Seaford to Eastbourne in East Sussex. It has several Geological Conservation Review sites.

This site is of national importance for both its biological and geological features. Its habitats include chalk grassland, maritime grassland, chalk heath, foreshore, chalk cliffs, river meanders, and greensand reef. It has nationally rare plants, invertebrates, and birds. The site also exposes extensive chalk sections dating to the Late Cretaceous epoch around 80 million years ago.

References

Sites of Special Scientific Interest in East Sussex
Geological Conservation Review sites
Nature Conservation Review sites